Expo 86 is the third full-length album by Canadian indie rock band Wolf Parade. It was released on 29 June 2010.

Reception

Expo 86 received positive reviews from critics. On Metacritic, the album holds a score of 75/100 based on 26 reviews, indicating "generally favorable reviews."

"Expo 86" was recognized by Exclaim! as the No. 17 Pop & Rock Album of 2010. Exclaim! writer Josh O'Kane said: "Long gone are the densely layered sonic landscapes of Wolf Parade albums past ― Expo 86 marks an evolution in sound, but not a change. It's Spencer Krug's manic-pop circus meeting Dan Boeckner's twitchy Springsteen revivalism in one sprawling album that's simultaneously more disjointed and more confident than ever."

Track listing

Personnel 
 Spencer Krug – vocals, keyboards
 Dan Boeckner – vocals, guitar
 Arlen Thompson - drums, engineer, mixing
 Dante DeCaro – guitar, bass, percussion, keyboards
 Harris Newman - mastering
 Howard Bilerman - recording, mixing
 Efrim Menuck - engineer
 Gabrielle Butler - engineer (intern)
 John Golden - lacquer cut
 Dusty Summers and Wolf Parade - design
 Meqo Sam Cecil - photography
 Nick DeCaro - back cover photo
 Des Shearing - front cover photo

Charts

References

2010 albums
Wolf Parade albums
Sub Pop albums